"This House Is Not for Sale" is a song by American rock band Bon Jovi from their thirteenth studio album, This House Is Not for Sale. It was released as the album's lead single on August 12, 2016. The song was written by Jon Bon Jovi, John Shanks, and Billy Falcon, and it was produced by Bon Jovi and Shanks. Bon Jovi has said of "This House Is Not for Sale": "this song is about integrity and what we were going through these last three years. We've become even closer and, as the song says, 'this heart, this soul, this house is not for sale.'" It is the first single to feature new guitarist Phil X, who was also a co-writer. The song also features the promotion of unofficial bassist Hugh McDonald to a full-time band member.

Live performances
On October 5, 2016 Bon Jovi performed the song live on The Ellen DeGeneres Show.

Music video
The music video for "This House Is Not for Sale" was directed by Indrani. Portions of the video were filmed in Bethlehem, Pennsylvania, and in Allentown, Pennsylvania. In the video, the house marked "for sale" is 2415 South 6th Street, in Allentown. Towards the end of the video, as the camera pans away from South 6th Street, the PPL Building is visible on the left horizon. The cemetery shots are from St. Michael's Cemetery in South Bethlehem, Pennsylvania, with closed Bethlehem Steel Plant in the background.

The music video was published on YouTube on August 12, 2016.

Charts

Weekly charts

Year-end charts

Release history

References

Bon Jovi songs
2016 songs
2016 singles
Songs written by Billy Falcon
Songs written by Jon Bon Jovi
Island Records singles
Songs written by John Shanks